Scopula propinquaria is a moth of the  family Geometridae. It is found in China, Taiwan, Korea and Japan.

References

Moths described in 1897
propinquaria
Moths of Asia